NGC 4359 is a dwarf barred spiral galaxy seen edge-on that is about 56 million light-years away in the constellation Coma Berenices. It was discovered by astronomer William Herschel on March 20, 1787. It is a member of the NGC 4274 Group, which is part of the Coma I Group or Cloud.  

On the sky, NGC 4359 appears to lie closest to the flocculent spiral NGC 4414 which is also a member of the NGC 4274 Group and the Coma I cloud. However, their radial velocities differ by around 500 km/s suggesting an interaction between the two is unlikely.

See also
 List of NGC objects (4001–5000)
 NGC 4414
 Coma I

References

External links

4359
040330
Coma Berenices
Astronomical objects discovered in 1787
Barred spiral galaxies
Dwarf spiral galaxies
07483
Coma I Group